Charlie Capps (born 8 June 1997) is a  rugby union player who plays for Glasgow Warriors at the tighthead prop position.

Rugby Union career

Amateur career

Capps played for Ripon.

Scottish qualified, Capps went down the SRU route for recognition in 2018. He signed with the SRU's partnership club in France, Stade Niçois.

Professional career

Capps joined Yorkshire Carnegie in 2015-16. He made 10 appearances for Carnegie.

On 10 April 2019 it was announced that Capps would sign for Glasgow Warriors for the 2019–20 season.

He made his debut for the Warriors against Ulster Rugby on 14 September 2019.

International career

Capps represented England U18s in 2015.

References

External links 

Ultimate rugby biography

1997 births
Living people
English rugby union players
Glasgow Warriors players
Leeds Tykes players
People educated at Prince Henry's Grammar School, Otley
Rugby union players from Harrogate
Rugby union props
Stade Niçois players